Daigo Station is the name of multiple train stations in Japan.

 Daigo Station (Akita) - (醍醐駅) in Akita Prefecture
 Daigo Station (Kyoto) - (醍醐駅) in Kyoto Prefecture